The Liberty Affair was an incident that culminated to a riot in 1768, leading to the Boston Massacre on March 5, 1770. It involved the illegal British seizure of the Liberty, a ship owned by smuggler and merchant John Hancock. This incident, which showed the difficulties in enforcing the British revenue laws and the growing American resentment against British rule, formed part of the series of events that led to the American Revolution.

Liberty Affair 

While the Liberty Affair took place on 10 June 1768, it was triggered by an earlier episode involving the smuggling of sixty casks of wine by Captain Daniel Malcolm in the spring of the same year. The new incident, which transpired on May 9, 1768, involved customs collectors boarding one of Hancock's ships, the Liberty. They found 25 pipes of Madeira wine, a figure far less than the ship was capable of carrying. Customs officials thought that the shipment was similar to the previous case of Malcolm's wine smuggling. 

Initially, the two tidesmen who inspected the Liberty booty found no wrongdoing. However, a month later, when the British warship Romney was docked in Boston, one of these customs officials recanted his account. Thomas Kirk, the customs collector, claimed that there were around 100 casks and that the crew offloaded them so that a quarter was left for customs tax payment. He stated that he was imprisoned aboard the vessel for refusing to accept Hancock's bribe. On June 10, a riot erupted after British sailors began the process of towing the Liberty to the Romney. Malcolm, who was present when the British boarded Liberty, published an account in the Boston Chronicle detailing the illegal seizure of the vessel as well as his confrontation with the authorities. The customs house was attacked and the sailors were forced to retreat to the British warship and then to Castle William. The chief collector of customs, Joseph Harrison, his son, and Benjamin Hallowell, another customs official, were attacked by the mob when the crowd failed to block the British sailors who were towing the Liberty. Around 3,000 colonists participated in the riot. 

The British filed a lawsuit against the Liberty and Hancock. John Adams was contracted to serve as Hancock's lawyer. The trial was considered a form of political persecution against Hancock, who was part of the opposition to the Stamp Act and was a prominent member and financier of Boston's Whig politics. The trial lasted five months until the charges were dropped. Hancock would later serve as the president of the colonists' revolutionary government and was the first to sign the American Declaration of Independence.

The Liberty remained in the possession of the British Navy. John Sewall, the British advocate general for Massachusetts, secured the ship's forfeiture for violating Britain's Acts of Trade. Liberty became a sloop used to patrol the Rhode Island coast. In July 1769, it was burned by angry colonists after its crew seized two Connecticut ships.

Aftermath 
The Liberty Affair led the British Parliament to pass more restrictive laws to curb smuggling and increase troops to deal with the rebels in Massachusetts. Immediately after the Liberty Affair riot, Governor Francis Bernard was ordered to produce evidence against the leaders of the Boston insurrectionists so that they can be put to trial in England. Lord Hillsborough, the Secretary of State for the Colonies, also stationed two regiments from Halifax, Nova Scotia to garrison Boston. He also demanded the Massachusetts House of Representatives to rescind the circular requesting unity against the Townshend Acts or face dissolution. The House defied the order. The names of the 92 delegates who refused were commemorated in a "Liberty Bowl" created by the silversmith Paul Revere. These measures and incidents further contributed to the escalation of tensions. After the riot, there emerged a "snowballing" of events that would lead to the Boston Massacre. These events unified the colonies to support the non-importation policy of British goods, a development that Boston and Charleston was not able to accomplish previously.

References 

1768 in the Thirteen Colonies
American Revolution
Conflicts in 1768
Disasters in Boston
Massachusetts in the American Revolution
18th century in Boston